Michael Lisicky (born 1964) is an American non-fiction writer, journalist, and oboist with the Baltimore Symphony Orchestra. As a department store historian, Lisicky has given lectures at the New York Public Library, Boston Public Library, Free Library of Philadelphia, Enoch Pratt Free Library, DC Public Library, the Historical Society of Pennsylvania and at New York Fashion Week. He has appeared on CBS Sunday Morning and his works have appeared in such publications as The Philadelphia Inquirer, The Boston Globe, The Baltimore Sun, The Washington Post, and the Pittsburgh Post-Gazette. He has contributed to newspaper articles in The New York Times, The Wall Street Journal, Southern Living, and Fortune magazine and served as a historical consultant for the Oscar-nominated movie Carol. 

As an oboist, Lisicky has been a member of the Baltimore Symphony Orchestra since 2003 and was a former member of the Richmond Symphony and the Savannah Symphony. In July 2018, he was featured on the cover of the International Musician trade magazine and cited for his community outreach activities with his fellow BSO musicians. Lisicky serves as a historian for the Baltimore Symphony Orchestra and is the author of the Baltimore Symphony's 100th anniversary book.

From May 2020 through April 2021, Lisicky served as a contributing writer for Forbes.com. During the course of the year, he documented and reported on department store news and developments, from bankruptcies to perseverances. Lisicky received a Forbes Favorites 2020 citation for his work on the demise of Lord & Taylor.

Life
He was born in Camden, New Jersey and grew up in Cherry Hill, New Jersey. Lisicky is a 1982 graduate of Cherry Hill High School East and is a graduate of the New England Conservatory and the St. Louis Conservatory. 
He resides in the Fell's Point section of Baltimore, where he serves as the community's Towne Crier. Lisicky is married to oboist Sandra Gerster and has one daughter, Jordan.

Works

History

References

External links

Forbes contributor profile

1964 births
Musicians from Baltimore
Living people
Writers from Camden, New Jersey
Writers from Maryland
Musicians from Camden, New Jersey
Cherry Hill High School East alumni
People from Cherry Hill, New Jersey
American non-fiction writers
American classical oboists
Male oboists
Classical musicians from New Jersey